Cumbernauld is a large town in the historic county of Dunbartonshire and council area of North Lanarkshire, Scotland. It is the tenth most-populous locality in Scotland and the most populated town in North Lanarkshire, positioned in the centre of Scotland's Central Belt. Geographically, Cumbernauld sits between east and west, being on the Scottish watershed between the Forth and the Clyde; however, it is culturally more weighted towards Glasgow and the New Town's planners aimed to fill 80% of its houses from Scotland's largest city to reduce housing pressure there.

Traces of Roman occupation are still visible, for example at Westerwood and, less conspicuously, north of the M80 where the legionaries surfaced the Via Flavii, later called the "Auld Cley Road". This is acknowledged in Cumbernauld Community Park, also site of Scotland's only visible open-air Roman altar, in the shadow of the imposing Carrickstone Water Tower.

For many years Cumbernauld was chiefly populated around what is now called The Village with the medieval castle a short walk away surrounded by its own park grounds. The castle frequently hosted visiting royalty and the grounds were famous for their white cattle which were hunted in the oak forest. The town began to enlarge as the weaving industry of the village was supplemented by mining and quarrying as travel across Scotland became easier due to the Forth and Clyde Canal and the railways being constructed. Cumbernauld railway station, though some distance from the village, improved communications with Glasgow, Falkirk and Stirling.

Cumbernauld was designated as the site for a New Town on 9 December 1955. This led to rapid expansion and building for about 40 years until the town became established as the largest in North Lanarkshire. At the UK census in 2011, the population of Cumbernauld was approximately 52,000, housed in more than a dozen residential areas. Cumbernauld's economy is a mixture of some manufacturing, mainly on its industrial estates, as well as service industries in the town centre and in sites close to the M80.

Cumbernauld was featured in Our World, the first live multinational multi-satellite television production.

History

Early history

Cumbernauld's history stretches at least to Roman times, as Westerwood was a Roman fort on the Antonine Wall, the furthest and most northerly boundary of the Roman Empire. 
Two Roman temporary camps have been discovered and digitally reconstructed east of the fort, at Tollpark (now covered by Wardpark North) and at Garnhall, similar to the two at Dullatur. One of the most discussed Roman finds from Cumbernauld is a sandstone slab depicting Triton and a naked, kneeling captive. It was found on a farm at Arniebog (between the runway of Cumbernauld Airport and Westerwood Golf Course). The slab can now be viewed at the Hunterian Museum in Glasgow along with an uninscribed altar from Arniebog and other artefacts like the inscribed altar, and statuette found at Castlecary and an older copy of the Bridgeness Slab. In addition to these, an altarstone to Silvanus and the Sky dedicated by a centurion named Verecundus and his wife has been found. Cumbernauld also has the only Roman altar still in the open air in Scotland: the Carrick Stone. The stone has also been linked with Robert Bruce, being the place where he reportedly set up his standard on his way to Bannockburn. There is some evidence that coffins were laid on top of the stone on their way to the cemetery in Kirkintilloch and that the stone has been somewhat worn away.
 
Cumbernauld's name probably comes from the Gaelic comar nan allt, meaning "meeting of the burns or streams".  There are differing views as to the etymology of this. One theory is that from its high point in the Central Belt, its streams flow both west to the River Clyde and east to the Firth of Forth so Cumbernauld's name is about it being on a watershed. Another theory ascribes the name to the meeting point of the Red Burn and Bog Stank streams within Cumbernauld Glen. 'Cumbernauld' is generally considered to be a Gaelic name. However, early forms containing Cumyr- hint at a Cumbric predecessor derived from *cömber, 'confluence' (c.f Welsh cymer, 'confluence'), synonymous with Aber. This seems to be suffixed with Cumbric *-ïn-alt, a topographical suffix perhaps referring to a hill or slope (Welsh yn allt, 'at a hill').

There is a record of the charter of the lands of Lenzie and Cumbernauld, granted to William Comyn by Alexander II in 1216. Cumbernauld Castle was first built as a Norman-style motte and bailey castle. Owned by the Comyns, it was situated at the east end of the park, where the motte (mound) is still visible. The Flemings took possession of Cumbernauld Castle and its estate (1306) after Robert the Bruce murdered the Red Comyn. Robert Fleming was a staunch supporter of Bruce, and one of his companions that day. To provide proof that Comyn was dead, Fleming cut off his head in order to "let the deed shaw", a Fleming family motto ever since. On 1 October 1310 Robert the Bruce wrote to Edward II of England from Kildrum trying, unsuccessfully, to establish peace between Scotland and England. Abercromby describes Malcolm Fleming as returning home to Inverbervie with the formerly exiled 21-year-old King David II. Around 1371, the family built a second castle where the Cumbernauld House now stands. One castle wall exists but most of the stonework was recycled for the House or other buildings. King Robert III knighted Malcolm and granted Sir Malcolm Fleming and his heirs the charter to Cumbernauld Castle on 2 April 1406, just two days before the king's death. Malcolm (and his heir in 1427) were used as hostages to ransom James I back from the English. He also seems to have been arrested by James and imprisoned briefly in Dalkeith Castle. In 1440, this Malcolm Fleming attended the Black Dinner along with his 16-year-old friend Earl William Douglas and his 11-year-old brother David Douglas at Edinburgh Castle. Immediately after the dinner, at which a black bull's head was served, there was a trial on trumped-up charges and the brothers were beheaded in front of the 10-year-old King James II. Malcolm shared their fate three days later. Malcolm was succeeded by his son Robert.

The castle played host to the royalty of Scotland. James IV (1473–1513) wooed Margaret Drummond at Cumbernauld Castle, where Margaret's sister was married to Lord Fleming. The Drummond sisters lie buried in Dunblane Cathedral following their poisoning, possibly by a government determined to marry an unwilling King James to the sister of Henry VIII of England, Margaret Tudor. The murders made James IV a frequent visitor to Cumbernauld, Margaret Tudor accompanying him on one occasion. It is recorded that during this James' reign in 1500, the Black Death led to a special plea from the surviving people of Cumbernauld to the church authorities in Glasgow to allow them to establish their own cemetery rather than taking all their dead to St. Ninian's in Kirkintilloch. They were granted permission to do so, and used the ground at the existing Comyns' chapel which dates from the end of the 12th century.

Post Reformation history

James V is recorded as staying for a couple of days at the castle around 14 December 1529. In November 1542, Malcolm Fleming, Lord Chamberlain of Scotland to King James V, was taken prisoner by the English at the Battle of Solway Moss, but released at a ransom of 1,000 marks, paid on 1 July 1548. Mary, Queen of Scots visited the castle and reportedly planted a sweet chestnut tree in the grounds in 1561; she's also said to have planted a yew tree at Castlecary Castle, only a mile or two away, which still grows there. The whole great hall collapsed while the queen was staying at Commernalde on 26 January 1562, and 7 or 8 men were killed. Most of the queen's party were out hunting. Mary was not hurt and visited the relatives of those who were injured or killed in the village below. Royalty often visited the town to hunt the rare Scottish ox, or white cattle, which roamed in the woods around Cumbernauld. These woods were a surviving fragment of the ancient Caledonian Forest, in which the oxen abounded at least till 1571 and probably until the building of the new house. Many of these were deliberately killed by Regent Lennox's men and a plaintiff complains: "And amonges others greite enormyties perpetrated be th' erles men of werre they have slayne and destroyed the dere in John Fleming's forest of Cummernald and the quhit ky and bullis, to the gryt destructione of polecie and hinder of the commonweil. For that kynd of ky and bullis hes bein keipit this money yeiris in the said forest; and the like was not mentenit in ony uther partis of the Ile of Albion as is well knowen." "(In English, And amongst others, great enormities perpetrated by the Earl's soldiers, they have slain and destroyed the deer in John Fleming's forest of Cumbernauld and the white cows and bulls, to the great destruction of the park of the estate and hindering of the common good. For those kind of cows and bulls have been kept these many years in the said forest; and their like was not maintained in any other parts of the British Isles as is well known.")

John Livingstone stayed often at Cumbernauld between 1632–1634. He was staying there during the Shotts Revival on Monday 21 June 1630 when he preached and 500 people in one day had "a discernible change wrought upon them." In 1640, eighteen Scottish noblemen met at Cumbernauld to sign the Cumbernauld Bond to oppose the policies of the Earl of Argyll who controlled the dominant political faction in Scotland. Cumbernauld may have been created a Burgh of barony in 1649, although there is some dispute from Hugo Millar. The Earl of Wigton was ordered to garrison the castle in 1650. Cumbernauld Castle was besieged and largely destroyed by Cromwell's General Monck in 1651. Irvine records that the old castle was burned to the ground by "a party of Highlanders during the rebellion of 1715."

Cumbernauld House, which still survives, was designed by William Adam and built in 1731 near the older castle. In 1746, the retreating Jacobite army was billeted for a night in Cumbernauld village. Rather than stay in Cumbernauld House, the commander, Lord George Murray, slept in the village's Black Bull Inn, where he could enforce closer discipline on his soldiers. After the new house was built, the castle was converted to stables, but was accidentally burnt down by dragoons posted there in 1746. The House's grounds, located in the Glen, are used today as a park, known as Cumbernauld Park.

Post-Industrial Revolution

Workers laboured on about 40–50 farms and details from 1839 have been recorded for both arable and livestock farming. Some of them were said to make a "very considerable income" for their owners. Weaving was an important part of the town's industry particularly during the Industrial Revolution. Irvine records that in 1841 a fifth of the whole population of 4501 people worked on about 600 hand looms. Cotton weaving was not a lucrative profession; cottage workers struggled to make ends meet especially when competing with ongoing industrialisation. In October 1878, this was compounded by the failure of the Bank of Glasgow in which much of the village's money was invested. Many lowland workers migrated and Groome's Gazetteer 1896 records a dwindling population and states "Handloom weaving of checks and other striped fabrics is still carried on, but mining and quarrying are the staple industry." There tended to be plenty of work, but times were hard even for skilled labourers like the nearby Calton weavers. 
The mining and quarrying industries flourished after the completion of the Forth and Clyde Canal in 1790. Quarrying of limestone, coal and clay took place in Cumbernauld, for example at Glencryan, where adits to the old fireclay mines are still clearly visible. Groome's Gazetteer (1882–86) states: "A colliery is at Netherwood just north of the airport ironstone has been mined to a small extent by the Carron Company (at Westerwood farm); and limestone, brick-clay, sandstone, and trap are all of them largely worked, the sandstone for building, the trap for road-metal, paving, and rough masonry." The mine at Netherwood was hand-pumped, although other mines in Cumbernauld had machine pumps to clear them of water. There was a fire clay works at Cumbernauld owned by the Glenboig Union Fireclay Company Limited.

Cumbernauld railway station was built by the Caledonian Railway and opened in August 1848 on their line from Gartsherrie (on the former Garnkirk and Glasgow Railway) to Greenhill on the Scottish Central Railway. It closed within a year but re-opened in the 1870s.

Parish records give a snapshot of heads of family's occupations in 1835 and 1839 including several bakers, servants, shoemakers and wrights. The Ordnance Survey Name Books of 1860 provide land-use information from around the same period. Cumbernauld was long a staging-post for changing horses between Glasgow and Edinburgh and there were several inns and a smiddy as well as half a dozen coaches a day to various towns. Old maps like the 1899 O.S. map show other employment like a gas works and a stocking factory in The Village and a corn mill at Lenziemill close to the old brick and pipe works. Three schools were run but the teachers were not always paid by the heritors. There were several church ministers and the Established church paid, out of collections, about 25 poor people a week who could not support themselves. Groome also records clerical work as there was a post office, two banks (held two days a week in a room in the inn) and a library with a newsroom.

In 1880, Jane Lindsay (also called Luggie Jean on account of a deformity which gave the impression of having an extra ear) was murdered in a pool of water on the edge of Fannyside Moor, coincidentally near the stream called Luggie Water. A local farmer was charged with her murder. Forensic experts, professors at Glasgow and Edinburgh, appeared as witnesses on opposing sides at the trial, and a not proven verdict was returned.

When shires were first established in Scotland in the twelfth century, the parish of Cumbernauld was included in Stirlingshire. At some point in the fourteenth century it and the neighbouring parish of Kirkintilloch were transferred to Dunbartonshire, despite not adjoining the rest of that shire. The two parishes were briefly restored to Stirlingshire between 1503 and 1509, but from 1509 until 1975 they again formed an exclave of Dunbartonshire. Between 1975 and 1996 Cumbernauld was part of the Cumbernauld and Kilsyth District of Strathclyde region. Since 1996 it has been part of North Lanarkshire. The arms of Cumbernauld and Kilsyth District Council featured the white cattle and the motto of "Daur and Prosper" boldly asserting Dare and Prosper. However the open Bible and the miner's lamp were the only symbols which were carried on to the North Lanarkshire coat of arms.

New Town history
Cumbernauld was designated a New Town on 9 December 1955. This being in the post-war era there are abundant film, photographic and paper records of this which are now being digitised. There was an inaugural ceremony on 28 June 1957 with Viscount Muirshiel, Secretary of State for Scotland of which some silent, colour footage survives. See the On film and TV section for link to this and other footage from this period.

After the Second World War, Glasgow was suffering from a chronic shortage of housing, which was often of poor quality and had residents living in overcrowded and unsafe conditions, particularly in areas such as the Gorbals. As a direct result, the Clyde Valley Regional Plan 1946 allocated sites where satellite new towns were to be built to alleviate the problem through an overspill agreement. Glasgow would also undertake the development of its peripheral housing estates. Cumbernauld was designated as a New Town in 1955, the third to be designated in Scotland. The others were East Kilbride, Glenrothes, Livingston and Irvine (Cowling 1997).

The development, promotion and management was undertaken, until 1996, by the Cumbernauld Development Corporation (CDC). This was a quango appointed by the Secretary of State for Scotland (Cowling 1997). The area allocated was 4,150 acres (1,680 ha) lying between and incorporating the existing villages of Condorrat and Cumbernauld. The first new housing became available in 1958. An additional 3,638 acres (1,472 ha) was added to the designated town area on 19 March 1973 to accommodate a revised target population of 70,000.

Cumbernauld is the clearest example of a modernist new town vision in the UK. Housing was originally built in a series of satellite neighbourhoods clustered around the hilltop town centre. Separation of people and cars was a major element of the first town masterplan, and this was carried through for much of the development of the town. Cumbernauld pioneered designs for underpasses and pedestrian footbridges as well as segregated footpaths.  Early neighbourhoods were designed by the CDC and were constructed at Ravenswood, Seafar and Kildrum, north of the Town Centre and Carbrain to the south. Other neighbourhoods were later developed at the Village, Greenfaulds, Condorrat, and Abronhill. Much of the housing in these areas won awards for their innovative designs.

Cumbernauld town centre's lead designer was Geoffrey Copcutt. Phase 1 was opened by Princess Margaret in 1967, of which some footage survives.

When originally designated as a New Town, the target population was 50,000. In 1961, only five years after becoming a new town, the area to the north of the A80 was added to the town's area with new planned neighbourhoods at Westfield, Balloch, Westerwood and Carrickstone. As a result, a revised target population of 70,000 was set. However, the 2011 UK Census still only shows about 52,000 residents.

When Raymond Gillies, a local businessman, gave Cumbernauld the St Enoch's station clock, in 1977, the Queen was celebrating her Silver Jubilee. To mark the occasion, the Queen started the clock using the pendulum motion and unveiled a commemorative plaque at Cumbernauld Town Centre, at the staircase joining the upper mall area with the old Woolco store. The clock is featured in Gregory's Girl and is now in the Antonine Centre.

After the creation of the new town, diverse industries such as high-tech, electronics, and chemical and food processing became large employers, along with the Inland Revenue (now Her Majesty's Revenue and Customs). The main industrial estates were developed to the east and west along the A80 at Wardpark and Westfield. Areas at Blairlinn and Lenziemill to the south of the town have also been developed for industry.

The Cumbernauld Development Corporation (C.D.C.) disbanded in 1996.

Modern times

The Modern era for the town can be dated from the disbanding of the C.D.C. in 1996.

The intended core of Cumbernauld remains the Town Centre buildings, all of which is essentially contained within one structure, segmented into "phases", the first of which was completed in 1967, the latest of which began construction in May 2003 for completion around September 2004. Initially the basic groundwork for the new shops began in 1997 and were finally completed in summer 2007. Designed to be a commerce centre, an entertainment and business venue and a luxury accommodation site, it was widely accepted as Britain's first shopping centre and was the world's first multi-level covered town centre. However, the town never developed to its planned size, and the town centre has never had the life envisaged by town planners. Further expansion has been primarily to provide further space for shops. A substantial portion of the original shopping centre was demolished due to structural damage and has been redeveloped as a new shopping and leisure complex.

As well as the unfulfilled ambitions for the town, the passage of time has exposed serious defects in post-war concepts of centrally-planned retail and civic centres developed in the absence of proper community consultation or sensitivity to local environmental and economic conditions. This has been reflected in a country-wide backlash against brutalist architecture in general. Cumbernauld's Town Centre is widely regarded as one of the ugliest and least-loved examples of post-war design in Scotland. The confusing layout is an abiding source of frustration for both visitors and residents, many of whom are the descendants of skilled workers who aspired to escape the frequently appalling social and housing conditions of the Glasgow conurbation in the 1960s and 1970s.

Despite its bad press, from a purely aesthetic standpoint Cumbernauld is regarded as representing a significant moment in town design, and in 1993 it was listed as one of the sixty key monuments of post-war architecture by the international conservation organisation DoCoMoMo.

The residential structure of Cumbernauld is noteworthy in that there were no pedestrian crossings, i.e. zebra or pelican crossings; pedestrians originally traversed roads by bridge or underpass.

Industry

Some well-known companies use Cumbernauld as a base including Mackintosh, and Farmfoods who operate in Blairlinn. Cumbernauld in the last few years has seen a surge of business activity with the OKI UK headquarters moving across town to Westfield close to Yaskawa Electronics. Irn-bru makers A.G. Barr also has its world headquarters in the Westfield part of the town. The old Isola-Werke factory in the Wardpark area has been converted into film studios and production facilities for the TV series Outlander which frequently films within the town's greenspaces. In particular, the Scottish Wildlife Trust's Cumbernauld Glen reserve, has been used as a backdrop whose ancient oak forest remnant provides a convenient stand-in for 18th Century Highlands' scenes. In May 2016, North Lanarkshire Council agreed to the expansion the Wardpark site if funding could be found. Another industrial estate Lenziemill is home to Dow Waste Management and furniture maker Aquapac amongst others.

Environment

Cumbernauld consists of more than 50% green space, and was designed to incorporate green spaces as a resource for the community.

The Scottish Wildlife Trust owns four wildlife reserves in the town – Cumbernauld Glen, Luggiebank Wood, Forest Wood, and Northside Wood. These habitats include ancient oak forest (with attendant bluebell displays in early summer) and large areas of Scots pine coverage.

Cumbernauld (like Ben Lomond) lies on the Scottish watershed, the drainage divide which separates river systems that flow to the east from those that flow to the west. There are two main waterways which flow out of Cumbernauld: the Red Burn (from which the town's Gaelic name is derived) and the Luggie Water (immortalised by David Gray). The Red Burn flows through Cumbrnauld Glen and there are walkways alongside this and the Bog Stank. There is also a footpath along the Glencryan Burn with miles of pathways up towards Pallacerigg and Fannyside Lochs.

Fannyside Muir, to the south of the town, is part of the Slamannan plateau, an area of 183 hectares of lowland bog.  This habitat is being restored by a variety of organisations including the national insect charity Buglife.  The plateau is designated as a SSSI (Site of Special Scientific Interest) and an SPA (Special Protection Area), partly because of its nationally important population of Taiga Bean Geese (Anser fabialis fabialis).

There are a large number of parks, and there are also LNRs (Local Nature Reserves) and SINCs (Sites of Importance for Nature Conservation) owned and managed by North Lanarkshire Council. For example St. Maurice's Pond as a SINC and Ravenswood has a LNR. In 1993 Broadwood Loch, a balancing lake, was created by damming the Moss Water and using a plastic waterproof membrane, and a  wall to hold back the water. This was primarily to prevent flooding downstream but also for recreation.

A landscape scale conservation partnership led by the Scottish Wildlife Trust, the Cumbernauld Living Landscape (CLL), operates in the town with the aim of enhancing, connecting and restoring the greenspaces and improving people's perceptions of and access to them.

In 2014, the CLL obtained camera trap footage of pine martens living in the woods within Cumbernauld and the return of this species (formerly extinct across the central belt of Scotland) has become a central plank of the organisation's strategy to improve perceptions of nature in the town.

Awards
In 1967 the Institute of American Architects voted Cumbernauld the world's best new town conferring the Reynold's Memorial Award.  Cumbernauld is a two-time winner of the Carbuncle Awards in 2001 and 2005. The town has since received the award of 'Best Town' at the Scottish Design Awards 2012. The Royal Town Planning Institute (RTPI) awarded the town a certificate in March 2014 for its success as a New Town. In 2015 the Town Centre was awarded the Green Apple Environmental Award. Cumbernauld won the 2013 Beautiful Scotland Award for the best "Small City". It has also received silver medals each year since 2009, the most recent being in 2017. In 2017 Cumbernauld was also awarded the Garden for Life Biodiversity Award.

Sport and leisure

Cumbernauld hosts Clyde F.C, who play football in the Scottish League One and reside at Broadwood Stadium, which has been their home since they relocated from their traditional base of Glasgow in February 1994. Their prior interim use of other football grounds has led Clyde fans to be known as the "Gypsy Army".

In 2012, Broadwood Stadium's grass pitch was replaced by a new artificial FIFA standard 3G surface in a partnership between fellow tenants and Lowland League club Cumbernauld Colts, North Lanarkshire Leisure and the local council. Cumbernauld is home to Junior football side Cumbernauld United who play at Guy's Meadow.
Five-a-side can be played at the Tryst Sports Centre or Broadwood who also have seven-a-side and full size pitches. Pitches are bookable at Ravenswood and Oak Road too. Broadwood also has a BMX track and spin classes for cycling.

The town's rugby team, Cumbernauld RFC, were formed in 1970 and grew to have 3 senior men's teams and several junior teams. The club and council agreed in the late 1970s to develop the Auchenkilns area in Condorrat. The multi-sports facility opened in 1979 and is now shared with Kildrum United FC. They play in West Region League 3, the 7th tier of club rugby in Scotland.
The Cumbernauld Gymnastics Club moved into its base at Broadwood Gymnastics Academy in the early 1990s it, a purpose built building at the same site as Broadwood Stadium. They also have tennis and short tennis at Broodwood. Dance classes are held at a number of location including Cumbernauld Theatre which also has drama classes and programmes.

The Cumbernauld Handball Team, Tryst 77, which in 2007 came second in the British Handball Championships. The Tryst houses the Cumbernauld swimming team, the Tryst Lions wrestling club and squash and badminton courts as well as gyms. Martial arts are practised in The Link, the Tryst and at Broodwood. Raw Taekwondo also have a centre at Westfield Industrial Estate.

The Palacerigg Field Archers, that meets for practice at the Tryst Sports Centre and has an archery course at the nearby Palacerigg Country Park where competitions are held. Palacerigg also has one of the town's three golf courses; the other two are Dullatur Golf Club, and Westerwood, which was designed by Seve Ballesteros and Dave Thomas.

Snooker is played at the Red Triangle. Bowls is played in the Village, Abronhill, Ravenswood and in Condorrat. A small attraction World of Wings near Blairlinn houses a collection of birds of prey, offering flying displays and conservation activities.

Transport

In terms of public transport, Cumbernauld has bus links to Glasgow, including the airport, Stirling, Falkirk, Dunfermline and St Andrews, which are operated by FirstGroup and Stagecoach. Various parts of the town are linked by local bus services, operated by smaller companies such as Canavan Travel and Dunn's Coaches. Rail services to and from the town are provided by ScotRail.

The town has rail links to Glasgow, Falkirk, Motherwell and Edinburgh via Cumbernauld railway station. There is also a station at Greenfaulds. Croy railway station to the north of the town has rail links to Edinburgh, Alloa, Dunblane and Glasgow. The lines through Croy and Cumbernauld stations were electrified in 2017 as part of the Edinburgh to Glasgow Improvement Programme (EGIP). Other working lines include the Argyle Line and the North Clyde Line.

Nearby motorway links include the M8, M73, M74, M80, M876 and M9. A local campaign was recently initiated to protest at the proposed extension of the M80 within the town limits. The A80 was upgraded to the M80, opening fully in 2011.

Cumbernauld Airport (EGPG) is primarily used for the training of fixed wing and rotary wing pilots, it also has an aircraft maintenance facility. The airport has a CAA Ordinary Licence that allows flights for the public transport of passengers or for flying instruction as authorised by the licensee, Cormack Aircraft Services Limited. The airport was opened by the Cumbernauld Development Corpororation in the late 1980s. Before the airport was constructed there was a grass strip in use on the same site.

Media and Culture
The local Cumbernauld newspaper is the Cumbernauld News.

Cumbernauld FM is a community station broadcasting to the town of Cumbernauld and surrounding areas on 106.8 FM and online.

The Lanternhouse Theatre was opened in the grounds of Cumbernauld Academy to replace Cumbernauld Theatre which closed in 2019. The theatre company grew out of the community run Cottage Theatre (EST. 1963) set up in 1978 as a charitable trust run civic theatre. Over the years it has built up a favourable reputation on the Scottish arts scene, for both its in-house productions and community outreach initiatives. In 2019 the company won a Fringe First award at the Edinburgh Festival Fringe.

Governance
Cumbernauld has 11 council members out of 69 North Lanarkshire Councillors.

Jamie Hepburn is the area's elected MSP for the Scottish Parliament constituency. He is also a member of the Scottish National Party. As part of the Central Scotland region there are 7 additional MSPs. Of these four are Labour (Mark Griffin, Monica Lennon, Richard Leonard and Elaine Smith; and 3 are Conservative (Alison Harris, Margaret Mitchell and Graham Simpson).

Stuart McDonald is the area's elected MP for the UK Parliament constituency. He is a member of the Scottish National Party. As he said in his maiden speech he has sometimes been mistaken for his namesake who is also an SNP MP.

Until the UK's withdrawal from the European Union on 31 January 2020, there were also 6 MEPs for Scotland (European Parliament constituency) from four different parties.

Education

Historical
The New Statistical Accounts of Scotland (April 1839) described 3 schools:
Cumbernauld Village 80–90 pupils, Condorat [sic] 60–70 pupils, Garbethill [East Fannyside] 20 pupils. It records "few people between 6 and 15 are unable to read the Bible". Groome's Gazetteer (1896) has "Three public schools – Cumbernauld, Condorrat, and Arns [near today's Abronhill] – and Drumglass Church school, with respective accommodation for 350, 229, 50, and 195 children, had (1880) an average attendance of 225,98,30, and 171." With the coming of the railway a new school was built after some controversy. Opening in 1886, it was known as the Southern District School and was close to the railway station.

Historical New Town primary schools include: Cumbernauld Primary (village), Glenhead Primary, Hillcrest Primary (Carbrain Temporary School), Langlands Primary, Melrose Primary,, Sacred Heart Primary, Seafar Primary, and St Joseph's. 
Historical New Town secondary schools include: Abronhill High (Closed as of July 2014) and Cumbernauld High (became Cumbernauld Academy).

Primary schools
Abronhill Primary
Baird Memorial Primary
Carbrain Primary
Condorrat Primary
Cumbernauld Primary
Eastfield Primary
Kildrum Primary
Ravenswood Primary
St. Andrew's Primary
St. Helen's Primary
St. Lucy's Primary
St. Margaret of Scotland Primary
St. Mary's Primary
Westfield Primary
Whitelees Primary
Woodlands Primary

Secondary schools
Cumbernauld Academy with new school building which opened in 2019, old building has since been demolished.
Greenfaulds High School with new school building which opened in September 2016, old building has since been demolished.
Our Lady's High School
St. Maurice's High School

Additional support needs (ASN) schools
Glencryan School
Redburn School

Further education
New College Lanarkshire (formerly Cumbernauld College)

Religion


There are currently at least 22 churches in the town.
These include:

Church of Scotland 
Abronhill Parish
Condorrat Parish
Cumbernauld Old Parish
Kildrum Parish
St Mungo's

Roman Catholic
Our Lady and St. Helen's
Sacred Heart
St. Joseph's
St. Lucy's

Other churches
Apostolic Church
Carbrain Baptist Church
Cornerstone Christian Fellowship
Craigalbert Church
Cumbernauld Free Church 
United Presbyterian church."
Freedom City Church
Holy Name Episcopal Church
Mossknowe Gospel Hall
The Salvation Army
United Reformed Church
Jehovah's Witnesses
Latter Day Saints Church

Demographics

On film and TV

Film

 Cumbernauld (1957) colour 2 mins. Cutting turf silent – inaugural ceremony on 28 June 1957 with Viscount Muirshiel, Secretary of State for Scotland.
 Building New Houses at Cumbernauld. (1959) colour 6 mins possibly Braehead Rd. Kildrum or Fleming Rd. Seafar?
 Glasgow (1963) colour 20 mins Douglas Gray Includes very brief footage of East Kilbride and Cumbernauld
Look at Life – Living with Cars (1964) colour 9 mins clip From 6m55 in the YouTube clip
 British Movietone News (1965) B&W 2 min Roundabout International journalists visit Cumbernauld.
 The Design of Space (1966) Dir: Don C. Chipperfield (minutes 1–3) with incredible pronunciation of Cumbernauld.
 Pathe News (1967) B&W 1 min Princess Margaret in Cumbernauld to open Phase 1 
New Towns (1969) 22 mins colour. A study of the new towns of East Kilbride, Glenrothes, Cumbernauld and Livingston.
 Cumbernauld, Town For Tomorrow (1970) 25 mins colour. Director Robin Crichton. Narrated by Magnus Magnusson
 Marshall-Orr (1975) 17 mins colour silent Has some footage of the Town Centre and railway station.
 Cumbernauld HIT (1977) 44 mins colour. A James-Bond type fiction film about an evil woman's plans to 'hi-jack' the New Town of Cumbernauld with a bio-weapon dir: Murray Grigor, Sponsor: CDC. Has some chase sequences round the old Town Centre.
  Gregory's Girl Bill Forsyth's 1981 film set in Abronhill High and around the town. The name of the town in the film was Climackston New Town (sic) and it was signed as being 20 miles from Glasgow, 25 miles from Edinburgh and 9000 miles from Caracus.
 Spaniards in Cumbernauld (2016) – A 13-minute documentary in English made for an HND project.
 Night-time Window on Wildlife (2017) 4 mins – Cumbernauld Living Landscape's footage with volunteers' help.
Beats (2019) Brian Welsh's film set in 1994 about two Scottish friends who head out for a final night of partying before they go their separate ways.

TV
 STV Town Planning – The New Town of Cumbernauld (1966) Geoff Rimmer
 STV – Gallimaufrey (c. 1970) 3 mins colour – A Cumbernauld Poem – A vision of a new town
 STV – Cumbernauld (c. 1973) 3 mins colour, silent – A look at Cumbernauld whilst much of the area is still under construction
 It's a Knockout (1981) BBC 45 mins Dunfermline vs Cumbernauld vs Glenrothes (can be found with video search).
 STV's The Riverside Show had a 12-minute piece by Lizzie Clark on 28 August 2014 including interviews with Councillor Tom Johnston and Outlander producer David Brown.
 STV had a short piece about the positives of the town: Reasons Cumbernauld is possibly the best place in Scotland.
Happy Birthday to the Town for Tomorrow! (May 2017) 3 mins – Short BBC compilation for 50th; includes Dudley Leaker.
A look back at the town of Cumbernauld (December 2017) 4 mins – Sixty years on from Cumbernauld's inauguration as a new town, BBC Rewind visits to see how it has changed and hear the memories of some of the first residents.

Wardpark Film and Television Studios
Wardpark Film and Television Studios is a 200,000 square foot facility, based in the Wardpark Industrial Estate, owned by Hackman Capital Partners and partner Square Mile Capital Management.  The Outlander TV series used Wardpark Studios as its base for sets. Several scenes from the TV series were shot in local woodland.  CGI. for Marvel's Infinity War was filmed at Wardpark Studios.

Residential areas of the town
Many of Cumbernauld's residential areas retain the names of previous farms in their vicinity.

Abronhill
Balloch
Blackwood
Carbrain
Carrickstone
Condorrat
Craigmarloch
Cumbernauld Village
Eastfield
Greenfaulds
Kildrum
Luggiebank
Ravenswood
Seafar
Smithstone
Westerwood
Westfield
Whitelees

Twin towns
  Bron, France

Notable people from Cumbernauld 
 Andy Anderson (born 1953), footballer
 Ifeoma Dieke (born 1981), footballer
 Craig Ferguson (born 1962), comedian
 Jon Fratelli (born 1979), musician and songwriter
 Jay Fulton, (born 1994), footballer
 John Gibb (18311909), painter
 Andrew Haddow (19031979), footballer
 Reid Jack (19242003), golfer
 Steve Kean (born 1967), footballer and team manager
 Blair Malcolm (born 1997), footballer
 Andrew McAtee (18881956), footballer
 Tom McAteer (18761959), footballer
 Lynn McCafferty (born 1979), handball player
 Jimmy McCulloch (1953-1979), rock guitarist
 Bob McNicol (19331980), footballer
 Neil Primrose (born 1972), musician
 Paula Sage, actress

See also
List of places in North Lanarkshire
List of settlements in Scotland by population

References
Specific references:

General references:

Cowling, D (1997) An Essay for Today- The Scottish New Towns 1947–1997 (Rutland Press, Edinburgh)
 Scotland on Film new town archive
 Film- New Towns in Scotland
 Times Online article
 Cumbernauld Park
 Cumbernauld, Town for Tomorrow
 New Towns: Can They Be Given New Life?
 360 Degree Panoramas of Cumbernauld Airport from musicpro.co.uk

External links

Cumbernauld Community Forum - The local committee who organise the annual Cumbernauld Gala Day.
Cumbernauld FM - Community radio station.

 
New towns in Scotland
1956 establishments in Scotland
Towns in North Lanarkshire
Populated places established in 1956
New towns started in the 1950s